Gregory Léster Ruíz David (born March 8, 1981) is a Guatemalan player who currently plays for Halcones FC in the liga nacional the highest division in Guatemala. He was on the provisional roster for the Central American Cup Tigo 2014 USA. He is the nephew of Deborah Lastenia David, star of the late Celia Cruz video "La negra que tiene tumbao" , hence his nickname "El Tumbao".

References

External links 

https://web.archive.org/web/20160303215159/http://www.guatefutbol.com/liga-nacional/halcones-fc/10391-ruiz-castillo-y-martinez-regresaron-a-halcones-fc

1981 births
Living people
People from Izabal Department
Guatemalan footballers
Guatemala international footballers
Deportivo Marquense players
Deportivo Jalapa players
Xelajú MC players
C.S.D. Municipal players
C.D. Suchitepéquez players
Association football midfielders
2007 UNCAF Nations Cup players
2009 UNCAF Nations Cup players
2011 Copa Centroamericana players